Fuday (Scottish Gaelic: Fùideigh) is an uninhabited island of about  and is  one of ten islands in the Sound of Barra, a Site of Community Importance for conservation in the Outer Hebrides of Scotland.
It lies just east of Scurrival Point on Barra and west of Eriskay. Fuday is owned by the Scottish Government. Deserted since 1901, its peak population is recorded only as seven.

When cattle were first introduced to the island, they were killed by dehydration. The crofters who left the cattle on the island failed to show the animals the location of the only drinkable source of water on the island, a loch far inland on the island. The cattle thus could not find drinking water and died of thirst.

Notes and references

Islands of the Sound of Barra
Uninhabited islands of the Outer Hebrides